West Main Street Historic District, or West Main Street District or variations, may refer to:

United States (by state then city)

Georgia
West Main Street Commercial Historic District (Statesboro, Georgia), listed on the National Register of Historic Places (NRHP) in Bulloch County

Kentucky
 West Main Street Historic District (Georgetown, Kentucky), listed on the NRHP in Scott County, Kentucky
West Main Street District (Greenup, Kentucky), listed on the National Register of Historic Places in Greenup County, Kentucky
 West Main Street Historic District (Louisville, Kentucky), NRHP-listed

Massachusetts
 West Main Street Historic District (Marlborough, Massachusetts), NRHP-listed in Middlesex County
 West Main Street Historic District (Westborough, Massachusetts), NRHP-listed in Worcester County

North Carolina
 West Main Street Historic District (Forest City, North Carolina), NRHP-listed in Rutherford County
 West Main Street Historic District (Lincolnton, North Carolina), NRHP-listed in Lincoln County

Ohio
West Main Street District (Kent, Ohio), NRHP-listed in Portage County
 Lancaster West Main Street Historic District, Lancaster, Ohio, listed on the NRHP in Fairfield County
West Main Street District (Norwalk, Ohio), listed on the National Register of Historic Places in Huron County

South Carolina
 West Main Street Historic District (Chesterfield, South Carolina), NRHP-listed in Chesterfield County

Virginia
 West Main Street Historic District (Charlottesville, Virginia), NRHP-listed

Wisconsin
 West Main Street Historic District (Oconto, Wisconsin), NRHP-listed in Oconto County
 West Main Street Historic District (Platteville, Wisconsin), listed on the NRHP in Grant County

See also
Madison Square–West Main Street Historic District, NRHP-listed in Monroe County, New York
West Main Street–West James Street Historic District, NRHP-listed in Ostego County, New York
Main Street Historic District (disambiguation)
North Main Street Historic District (disambiguation)
South Main Street Historic District (disambiguation)
East Main Street Historic District (disambiguation)